Giovanni Coccapani (1582 – 1649) was an Italian painter and architect of the Baroque period. Born in Florence, his family was originally from Carpi. He was the brother of Sigismondo Coccapani. He travelled through Lombardy and was patronized by Duke Alfonso III in Modena. A number of architectural designs were collected by the lawyer Eustachio Cabassi of Carpi. He putatively rebuilt the San Giusto church in Volterra. Among his pupils was Ludovico Incontri.

References

1582 births
1649 deaths
Painters from Florence
16th-century Italian painters
Italian male painters
17th-century Italian painters